This is the order of battle for United Nations and North Korean forces during the Battle of Pusan Perimeter in August and September 1950 during the Korean War. The engagement brought each side to muster substantial ground, air and sea resources to fight across southeastern Korea.

The UN brought to bear hundreds of units from member countries South Korea, the United States, and the United Kingdom. Several other nations augmented the large naval task forces with ships of their own, including Australia, New Zealand, Canada, and The Netherlands. Opposing the UN force was the entirety of the North Korean military.

UN forces proved superior to the North Koreans in organization and numbers, but UN forces also suffered from a lack of equipment and training, particularly in their ground forces. As the battles around Pusan Perimeter continued, UN forces and equipment continued to flood into Korea, giving them overwhelming advantages in their land, air, and sea components. Though many nations would eventually contribute forces to the Korean War, the majority of troops at the battle were American and South Korean only.

North Korean forces were inferior to the UN forces in number, but in several cases they were able to make up for this in superior training. North Korean air and naval forces were small and poorly trained and equipped, thus playing a negligible role in the battle. However North Korean ground troops were often well trained and well equipped with modern weapons. The protracted battle around the perimeter severely depleted these troops forcing the North Koreans to rely increasingly on conscripts and replacements, diminishing their advantage in the battle and leading them to an eventual defeat.

UN Forces

Ground 

The United Nations forces were organized under the command of the United States Army. The Eighth United States Army served as the headquarters component for the UN forces, and was headquartered at Taegu. Under it were three weak US Divisions; the 24th Infantry Division was brought to the country early in July, while the 1st Cavalry Division and 25th Infantry Division arrived between July 14 and July 18. These forces occupied the western segment of the perimeter, along the Naktong river.

The Republic of Korea Army, a force of 58,000, was organized into two corps and five divisions; from east to west, ROK I Corps controlled the 8th Infantry Division and Capital Divisions, while the ROK II Corps controlled the 1st Division and 6th Infantry Division. A reconstituted ROK 3rd Division was placed under direct ROK Army control.  Morale among the UN units was low due to the large number of defeats at that point in the war. US Forces had suffered over 6,000 casualties over the past month while the South Korean Army had lost an estimated 70,000.

Troop numbers at the beginning of the battle were initially difficult to estimate for US and North Korean forces. Subsequent research indicates that the North Korean army had around 70,000 combat troops committed to the Pusan Perimeter on August 5, with most of its divisions far understrength. It likely had less than 3,000 personnel in mechanized units, and around 40 T-34 tanks at the front due to extensive losses so far in the war. MacArthur reported 141,808 UN troops in Korea on August 4, of which 47,000 were in US ground combat units and 45,000 were in South Korean combat units. Thus the UN ground force outnumbered the North Koreans 92,000 to 70,000.

Throughout September 1950 as the battle raged, more UN forces arrived from the US and other locations. The 2nd Infantry Division, 5th Regimental Combat Team, and 1st Provisional Marine Brigade and a British Army brigade arrived in Pusan later in the fighting, along with large numbers of fresh troops and equipment, including over 500 tanks. By the end of the battle, Eighth Army's force had gone from three under-strength divisions to four fully manned formations which were well equipped and well prepared for war. By the end of the battle, the 27th British Commonwealth Brigade had arrived to assist the American and South Korean units.

US 8th Army 
 Eighth United States Army
Commander: Lieutenant General Walton H. Walker

ROK Army

Air 

UN forces had a massive arsenal of air support at their disposal, provided by the US Air Force. This support was provided primarily by the Far East Air Forces (FEAF) and the Fifth Air Force, but US Navy and US Marine Corps aviation played a substantial role in supporting operations from the sea. UN Forces had complete control of the air and sea throughout the fight. and US Air Force and US Navy elements provided support for the ground units throughout the battle virtually unopposed. By the end of the battle the Eighth Army had more air support than General Omar Bradley's Twelfth United States Army Group in Europe during World War II.

By the end of July, the US had shipped a large number of aircraft of all types to Korea. On 30 July, the Far East Air Forces had 890 planes-626 F-80's and 264 F-51's-but only 525 of them were in units and available and ready for combat.

The Far East Air Force commanded a large contingent of long-range heavy bomber aircraft, and these assets were based in Japan, far from the North Koreans' striking range. Generally, the massive striking power was too unwieldy for the UN to use against the dispersed North Korean units, and the airpower of FEAF's B-29 Superfortresses was passed over in favor of smaller and more versatile fighter bombers of the Fifth Air Force. Under orders from MacArthur, however, the FEAF bomber command conducted one mission during the Pusan Perimeter fights.

On August 16, in the midst of the fight around Taegu, conducted one large carpet bombing operation northwest of Waegwan, where up to 40,000 North Korean troops were believed to be massing. The bombers from 10,000 feet dropped approximately 960 tons of 500- and 1,000-pound bombs. The attack had required the entirety of the FEAF bombing component, and they had dropped 3,084  bombs and 150  bombs. This comprised the largest Air Force operation since the Battle of Normandy in World War II.

General Walker reported to General MacArthur the next day that the damage done to the North Koreans by the bombing couldn't be evaluated because of smoke and dust, and ground forces couldn't reach it because of North Korean fire. Information obtained later from North Korean prisoners revealed the enemy divisions the Far East Command thought to be still west of the Naktong had already crossed to the east side and were not in the bombed area. No evidence was found that the bombing killed a single North Korean soldier.

However, the bombing seems to have destroyed a significant number of North Korean artillery batteries. The UN ground and air commanders opposed future massive carpet bombing attacks against enemy tactical troops unless there was precise information on an enemy concentration and the situation was critical. Instead, they recommended fighter-bombers and dive bombers would better support ground forces. They subsequently canceled a second bombing of an area east of the Naktong scheduled for August 19.

Far East Air Force and 5th Air Force

Naval aircraft 
The US Navy and Marine Corps aviation elements came to bear against the North Korean forces from five carriers during the battle: USS Valley Forge with Carrier Air Group 5, USS Philippine Sea with Carrier Air Group 11, HMS Triumph with two squadrons of the Fleet Air Arm, and two smaller carriers that supported Marine aircraft of the 1st Marine Aircraft Wing. Carrier Air Group 5 was the only Carrier-based air wing in the Far East at the time of the outbreak of war. Many of the pilots operating these aircraft were World War II veterans, however budget cuts following the end of the war had greatly reduced their training and readiness in the months before the war.

Early in the war, these aircraft were used primarily to conduct raids and gather intelligence on North Korean ground targets, focused on disrupting North Korean supply to the front lines. However, as soon as UN forces retreated to Pusan Perimeter following the Battle of Taejon, the Naval aircraft were immediately re purposed for close-air support and airstrikes against North Korean ground troops on the front. These missions were significantly more risky and the aircraft suffered much higher losses due to North Korean ground fire.

Sea 

The UN forces also had at their disposal a massive naval force of multi-national composition, which assisted in the defense of Pusan Perimeter at several crucial junctures. Ships of the fleet provided supporting artillery fire during pitched ground battles and provided a route of resupply and evacuation during other junctures. Multiple aircraft carriers provided bases for large contingents of aircraft that flew sorties and air strikes over North Korean ground forces.

UN ships continued to stream into the theater during and after the Pusan Perimeter engagement, and they played varying roles in support of the battle. The fleet was split into three primary groups; Task Force 77 formed the primary Aircraft carrier and striking component of the fleet, Task Force 96 consisted of a variety of smaller ships concerned with coastal bombardment, and Task Force 90 formed an attack transport squadron to assist in the evacuation and movement of ground troops.

Overall command of the naval force was taken by the US Seventh Fleet, and the bulk of the naval power provided was also from the US. The United Kingdom also provided a small naval task force including an aircraft carrier and several cruisers. Eventually, Australia, Canada and New Zealand provided ships as well. The Republic of Korea Navy itself was almost negligible during the battle. The South Koreans had a very small navy consisting of a few dozen minesweepers, LSTs, PT boats and other small craft donated to them by other UN member states. Compared to the larger UN fleet these craft played a very small role in the engagement, but North Korean naval ships, which were also very small, tended to target the ROK fleet more often.

US 7th Fleet 
Under Vice Admiral Arthur D. Struble, Task Force 77 formed the core Carrier striking force of the UN forces. The force contained the UN aircraft carriers as well as a number of attendant escorts. The lineup of the escorts differed as ships were assigned roles in Task Force 96 during the course of the battle.

Task Force 96, under Vice Admiral C. Turner Joy, was the largest organization of UN forces by number of ships. The force consisted primarily of cruisers, destroyers, and other smaller ships, which were used to blockade North Korean waterways and conduct coastal bombardments. Ships in this role would also periodically switch to Task Force 77, acting as a screen and escort for the UN aircraft carriers. This force was also the most diverse of the forces, as ships from five nations would eventually be assigned to it.

Task Force 90, under Rear Admiral James H. Doyle, was primarily concerned with amphibious operations in the theater. As such, it contained no combat ships, only attack transports and a large number of LSTs. The force consisted entirely of US ships. At least 15 LSTs were assigned to the force during the battle to support the attack transports.

Additionally, a number of other combat ships were used to ferry weapons and supplies to the growing UN force during the battle. These ships were not deployed in a combat role in this battle, though some would later be moved to combat service later on in the war.

North Korean Forces

Land 
The North Korean People's Army forces were organized into a mechanized combined arms force of ten divisions, originally numbering some 90,000 well-trained and well-equipped troops in July, with hundreds of T-34 Tanks. However, defensive actions by US and South Korean forces had delayed the North Koreans significantly in their invasion of South Korea, costing them 58,000 of their troops and a large number of tanks. To recoup these losses, the North Koreans had to rely on less experienced replacements and conscripts, many of whom they took from the conquered regions of South Korea. During the course of the battle, the North Koreans raised a total of 13 infantry divisions and one armored division to the fight at Pusan Perimeter.

From south to northeast, the North Korean units initially positioned opposite the UN units were the 83rd Motorized Regiment of the 105th Armored Division and then the 6th, 4th, 3rd, 2nd, 15th, 1st, 13th, 8th, 12th, and 5th Divisions and the 766th Independent Infantry Regiment.

North Korean People's Army

Air and Sea 
The Korean People's Navy controlled a very small force of around 50 or 60 ships, all of which were small ships. The navy possessed a few torpedo boats and gunboats among others, some of which were donated by the Soviet Union, but these ships were no match for the UN naval forces. Following the Battle of Chumonchin Chan, a one-sided engagement in which UN forces ambushed and crushed a small North Korean flotilla, North Korean ships generally avoided UN ships completely, leaving the UN naval forces virtually unopposed. North Korean torpedo boats may have conducted isolated attacks against similarly small South Korean ships but they did not oppose larger UN ships during the fight around the Pusan Perimeter. They could also not find resupply from Soviet or China as neither had a large standing navy in the region. This is seen by historians as one of the largest disadvantages North Korea had during the battle, as it allowed the UN complete sea and air superiority.

At the start of the Korean War in July, the Korean People's Air Force consisted of about 150 combat aircraft. This force was a mixture of Russian-built models and generally were in poor maintenance and repair. Fighter aircraft included Yakovlev Yak-7s, Yak-3s and a few Yak-9s, 70 in total. They controlled a handful of Ilyushin Il-10 for air-to-surface combat, and used Polikarpov Po-2 biplanes for training. These craft were poorly maintained and their pilots were eager but mostly untrained. However, the North Korean ground forces had much more modern equipment, including Anti-aircraft weapons and vehicles, which were more effective in threatening UN aircraft. North Korean aircraft engaged US aircraft in small, isolated dogfights throughout the battle, but the North Koreans were unable to muster a sufficient force of fighters to the front to seriously oppose the massive UN air component.

References

Citations

Sources 

 
 
 
 
 
 
 
 
 
 
 
 
 
 

Battle of Pusan Perimeter
Battles of the Korean War involving the United States 
Battles and operations of the Korean War in 1950 
Battles of the Korean War involving South Korea 
Battles of the Korean War involving North Korea 

Korean War orders of battle